Into Thin Air (Traditional Chinese: 人間蒸發) is a TVB modern drama series broadcast in September 2005.

Synopsis
Looking for a missing person is as difficult as looking for one fish in the ocean.
Ko Chung Ching (Michael Miu), an ex-policeman, quit his job to set up a private investigation company two years ago, right after his son Tsun Sing went missing because of a slap while Miu was searching for the "Rose Killer". His subordinates include Man Kai Ching Super (Power Chan), Man Tai Po (Bernice Liu) and Lam Yan Yan (Vivien Yeo).Kenneth Ma plays the cop who takes on Miu's "Rose Killer" case. Ching works and carries on looking for Sing. He meets Lai Siu (Melissa Ng) the manager of a group of part-time actors. She learns by chance that she was involved in Sing's disappearance, and as such feels guilty, so agrees to help find Sing. She uncovers a few clues and finds out Sing's disappearance
is connected to Sing's divorced wife and good friend Lau Kwok Wai (Wong Chi Yin). Ching is shocked by the truth... 
Ching and Siu become very close, but on their wedding day, Siu suddenly goes missing. When she reappears, she is a changed person, and Ching has to cope with another loved one mysteriously changing...
Little does he know, it's not quite her but someone genetically similar. Also in the process, Bernice and Kenneth's characters fall into a love triangle with Power, Rebecca Chan (Kenneth's older sister) and Benz Hui (Melissa's dad) have a romance after she dumps her 15-year married man affair.

Cast

Main cast

Guest starring

Other cast

Viewership ratings

References

External links
TVB.com Into Thin Air - Official Website 
Butterfly's Place.net Into Thin Air - Episodic Synopsis 

TVB dramas
2005 Hong Kong television series debuts
2005 Hong Kong television series endings